Highams Park School is a mixed secondary school with academy status in Highams Park, London, England. The school has a specialisms in technology and sports.

History
The school, originally named Sidney Burnell School, opened 20 May 1940 as a school for children up to age 14. It became a Secondary modern school in 1944 and a senior high comprehensive school in 1968. The name was changed to the current name around 1968. It became a voluntary aided school in 1999.

Houses 
The school has four houses:
 Burnell, named after Sidney Burnell, Director of Education in 1920 and the former name of the school
 Payling, named after Elizabeth Payling, an outstanding academic ex-student who is the Head of Regulation Programme Management at Royal Mail
 Gibson, named after Terry Gibson, an ex-pupil, professional footballer and Sky TV commentator
 Forest, named after Epping Forest, a nearby forest

Notable former pupils

Terry Gibson, ex-footballer, (Tottenham, Coventry, Man Utd, Wimbledon)
David Bentley, footballer, (Arsenal, Blackburn, Tottenham)
Charlie Daniels, footballer (Tottenham Hotspur, Leyton Orient, Bournemouth)
Steven Dominique Cheung, Politician, Broadcaster, Torch Bearer for the London 2012 Olympic Games
Jamie O'Hara, footballer, (Arsenal, Tottenham, Portsmouth)
Jermaine Pennant, footballer, (Arsenal, Birmingham, Stoke)
Kenzie, former rap performer
Abby Rakic-Platt, actress
Honey Lantree, drummer
Joe Willock, footballer, Newcastle United

References

External links

 Schools.net

Secondary schools in the London Borough of Waltham Forest
Academies in the London Borough of Waltham Forest